The Indra Ganesan College of Engineering (IGCE) is an engineering and research institute in Trichy, Tamil Nadu that is part of Anna University.

The college has undergraduate, postgraduate and doctoral programs.

Branches for research
Computer Science and Engineering
Electrical and Electronics Engineering
Information Technology
Electronics and Communication Engineering
Mechanical Engineering
Civil Engineering
ME-VLSI
ME-CSE
MBA

The college is also having an in-house management training institute and Institute of Higher Studies.

See also
List of colleges in Trichy

External links

Engineering colleges in Tamil Nadu
Colleges affiliated to Anna University
Universities and colleges in Tiruchirappalli